The following are the national records in Olympic weightlifting in Syria. Records are maintained in each weight class for the snatch lift, clean and jerk lift, and the total for both lifts by the Syrian Arab Weightlifting Federation.

Men

Women

References

Syria
Olympic weightlifting
Records
weightlifting